Through the Ashes of the Empire is a 1976 Romanian war drama film directed by Andrei Blaier.  Is a picaresque tale of betrayal, survival and coming of age based on a novel by Zaharia Stancu.

Plot
In 1917, during World War I, the Diplomate (Dinică) and young Darie (Oseciuc) escape from a Bucharest occupied by the German Army only to come across, as they progress 'through the ashes' of the Austro-Hungarian Empire, the sufferance, despair, generosity and heroism that will lead them to very different conclusions.

Cast

 Gheorghe Dinică as the Diplomate
  as young Darie  
  as Spelbul
  as Siteavul
  as Dodu
 Ernest Maftei as the Lăutar
  as the Sergeant (Feldwebel)
 	as a Romanian prisoner	
 	as the white-bearded prisoner
  as another prisoner
 Petre Gheorghiu as the prisoner with glasses 		
 Traian Petruț as another prisoner
 Ion Porsilă as another prisoner		
 Anton Aftenie	as Nea Aftenie, another prisoner	
  as a young prisoner
  as the Fisherman
  as the German officer
 Irina Petrescu as the Serbian woman
  as a Greek woman
 Elena Albu as another Greek woman
  as the Serbian partisan leader
 Mircea Bașta as the socialist militant
  as the Serbian interpreter
 Gheorghe Tomescu
  as the police commissioner
 Constantin Vîrtejanu
 Marieta Luca
 Emil Raisenauer
 Nicolae Simion
 Ion Manolescu
 Victor Radovici

References

External links

See also
 List of World War I films
 List of films based on war books

1976 films
1970s war drama films
1970s Romanian-language films
1970s German-language films
World War I films
Films set in 1917
Films set in Romania
1970s drama road movies
Films based on Romanian novels
Romanian historical drama films
1970s historical drama films
Films directed by Andrei Blaier
Romanian World War I films